Red is a programming language designed to overcome the limitations of the programming language Rebol. Red was introduced in 2011 by Nenad Rakočević, and is both an imperative and functional programming language. Its syntax and general usage overlaps that of the interpreted Rebol language.

The implementation choices of Red intend to create a full stack programming language: Red can be used for extremely high-level programming (DSLs and GUIs) as well as low-level programming (operating systems and device drivers). Key to the approach is that the language has two parts: Red/System and Red.

 Red is a homoiconic language capable of meta-programming, with Rebol-like semantics. Red's runtime library is written in Red/System, and uses a hybrid approach: it compiles what it can deduce statically and uses an embedded interpreter otherwise. The project roadmap includes a just-in-time compiler for cases in between, but this has not yet been implemented.

Red seeks to remain independent of any other toolchain; it does its own code generation. It is therefore possible to cross-compile Red programs from any platform it supports to any other, via a command-line switch. Both Red and Red/System are distributed as open-source software under the modified BSD license. The runtime library is distributed under the more permissive Boost Software License.

As of version 0.6.4 Red includes a garbage collector "the Simple GC".

Introduction
Red was introduced in the Netherlands in February 2011 at the Rebol & Boron conference by its author Nenad Rakočević. In September 2011, the Red programming language was presented to a larger audience during the Software Freedom Day 2011. Rakočević is a long-time Rebol developer known as the creator of the Cheyenne HTTP server.

Features
Red's syntax and semantics are very close to those of Rebol. Like Rebol, it strongly supports metaprogramming and domain-specific languages (DSLs) and is therefore a highly efficient tool for dialecting (creating embedded DSLs). Red includes a dialect called Red/System, a C-level language which provides system programming facilities. Red is easy to integrate with other tools and languages as a DLL (libRed) and very lightweight (around 1 MB). It is also able to cross-compile to various platforms (see Cross Compilation section below) and create packages for platforms that require them (e.g., .APK on Android). Red also includes a fully reactive cross-platform GUI system based on an underlying reactive dataflow engine, a 2D drawing dialect comparable to SVG, compile-time and runtime macro support, and more than 40 standard datatypes.

Goals
The following is the list of Red's Goals as presented on the Software Freedom Day 2011:

 Simplicity ("An IDE should not be necessary to write code.")
 Compactness ("Being highly expressive maximizes productivity.")
 Speed ("If too slow, it cannot be general-purpose enough.")
 Be "Green", Have a Small Footprint ("Because resources are not limitless.")
 Ubiquity ("Spread everywhere.")
 Portability, Write once run everywhere ("That’s the least expected from a programming language.")
 Flexibility ("Not best but good fit for any task!")

Development
Red's development is planned to be done in two phases:

 Initial phase: Red and Red/System compilers written in Rebol 2
 Bootstrap phase: Red and Red/System compilers complemented by a Red JIT-compiler, all written in Red

Cross compilation
Red currently supports the following cross-compilation targets:

 MS-DOS: Windows, x86, console (and GUI) applications
 Windows: Windows, x86, GUI applications
 Linux: Linux, x86
 Linux-ARM: Linux, ARMv5, armel (soft-float)
 Raspberry Pi: Linux, ARMv5, armhf (hard-float)
 FreeBSD: x86
 Darwin: OS X Intel, console (and GUI) applications
 Syllable: Syllable OS, x86
 Android: Android, ARMv5
 Android-x86: Android, x86
(Note: This list will increase with time and should therefore be considered as incomplete.)

Hello World!
Red [Title: "Simple hello world script"]
print "Hello World!"

Factorial example
IMPORTANT: These are intended as syntax examples. Until Red has 64-bit support, the integer example will overflow a 32-bit integer very quickly. Changing that to `float!` will go farther, but these are merely to show the syntax of the language.

The following is a factorial example in Red:

Red [Title: "A factorial script"]  ; Note: The title is optional.

factorial: func [
	x [integer!]  ; Giving the type of an argument in Red is optional
][
	either x = 0 [1][x * factorial x - 1]
]

The following is the same factorial example in Red/System (in this very simple case, the source code is very similar to Red's version):

Red/System [Title: "A factorial script"]

factorial: func [
	x       [integer!]                   ; This is compulsory in Red/System
	return: [integer!]                   ; This is compulsory in Red/System
][
	either x = 0 [1][x * factorial x - 1]
]

See also

 Rebol

References

External links

 
 Red Programming Language on GitHub
 Redprogramming.com
 

Functional languages
Systems programming languages
Extensible syntax programming languages
Domain-specific programming languages
Software using the BSD license
Software using the Boost license
Programming languages created in 2011
2011 software
High-level programming languages
Homoiconic programming languages